This article lists the main sport climbing events and their results for 2017.

World Cup

World Championships

Continental Championships

References

External links
 International Federation of Sport Climbing Website (IFSC)

 
Sport climbing
2017 in sports